Central Station is a light rail station served by METRORail in downtown Houston, Texas, United States.  It serves as a major transfer point between the Red, Purple and Green lines.

Infrastructure
The Red Line is served by an island platform along Main Street between Capitol Street and Rusk Street, and officially referred to as Central Station Main.  At the time of construction for the Green and Purple Line, the Red Line platform for the station was an infill along the existing line.

Trains served by the Green and Purple Lines eastbound utilize a side platform on Capitol Street between Fannin Street and San Jacinto Street (officially referred to as Central Station Capitol), and westbound trains serve a side platform on Rusk Street between Fannin Street and San Jacinto Street (officially referred to as Central Station Rusk).

History
The Red line platform opened on February 18, 2015 along the pre-existing rail line.
The Green and Purple line platforms opened May 23, 2015.

Points of interest
Destinations located within a short walk of the station include:

 The Downtown Aquarium
 Bayou Place
 Alley Theatre
 The Wortham Theater
 Minute Maid Park
 Jones Hall 
 Club Quarters Hotel
 JW Marriott Downtown Houston
 Bombay Indian Grill
 Cafe Express
 Flying Saucer Draught Emporium
 Springbok
 Sunny's Bar

References

METRORail stations
Railway stations in the United States opened in 2015
2015 establishments in Texas
Railway stations in Harris County, Texas